Abakanovo is a rural locality (a village) in Toropatskoye Rural Settlement of Andreapolsky District, Russia. The population was 1 as of 2010.

Geography 
Abakanovo is located 23 km northwest of Andreapol (the district's administrative centre) by road. Antanovo is the nearest rural locality.

References 

Rural localities in Andreapolsky District
Kholmsky Uyezd (Pskov Governorate)